Bilice can refer to one of the following towns:

Croatia
 Bilice, Požega-Slavonia County
 Bilice, Šibenik-Knin County

Bosnia and Herzegovina
 Bilice, Kotor Varoš